The discography of American singer and Linkin Park vocalist Mike Shinoda consists of four studio albums, two extended plays (EPs), six singles, six promotional singles and one other charted track.

His debut studio album, Post Traumatic, was released on June 15, 2018, via Warner Bros and Machine Shop. It topped the Top Rock Albums and Top Alternative Albums at number one and peaked on the Billboard 200 at sixteenth. The album also placed in the top ten of countries such as Germany, Austria, Switzerland and Czech Republic at number two, four, seven and nine respectively.

His debut EP, also titled Post Traumatic, was released on January 25, 2018 via Warner Bros and Machine Shop. Shinoda's best charting singles include "Crossing a Line", "Make It Up as I Go", "Watching as I Fall" and "Over Again", that have charted on either Rock Songs and/or Alternative Songs on Billboard.

Studio albums

Extended plays

Singles

As lead artist

As featured artist

Promotional singles

Other charted songs

Music videos

As Fort Minor

Studio album

Mixtapes 

 2005: Fort Minor Sampler Mixtape
 2005: Fort Minor: We Major

EPs 

 2006: Sessions@AOL
 2006: Fort Minor Militia EP

Instrumental albums 

 2005: Instrumental Album: The Rising Tied

Singles

Fort Minor Militia exclusive tracks 
Militia is the debut studio EP for the Fort Minor's official fan club, known as the "Fort Minor Militia". Subscribers were given exclusive tracks for digital download that were never officially released with the exception of "Kenji (Interview Version)" and "Believe Me (Club Remix)", which were later released to Linkin Park and Styles of Beyond's official websites respectively. These tracks are sometimes referred to as the Fort Minor Militia EP.

Music videos

With Linkin Park 
Main articles: Linkin Park discography and songs

References 

Discographies of American artists
Discography